Erythrina haerdii is a species of legume in the family Fabaceae. It is found only in Tanzania.

References

Sources

haerdii
Flora of Tanzania
Vulnerable plants
Taxonomy articles created by Polbot